The LG Optimus Pad is a tablet computer developed by LG Electronics for its own line-up and for specific mobile carriers in selected countries. Mobile carries include NTT DoCoMo and T-Mobile which unlike its domestic rival, Samsung offering the same tablet model for specific carriers, LG does not alter the specs of those they release to these carriers and the only alteration is on the addition of the mobile carriers logo on it. The LG Optimus Pad was first released in South Korea in April 2011 and then in the US in March 2011 which is also known as the T-Mobile G-Slate. It is  LG's first device running Android 3.0 ("Honeycomb") and appeared at the Mobile World Congress in February 2011.

Features
The LG Optimus Pad has a 2MP front-facing camera and a 5MP rear-facing camera. It features an 8.9-inch touchscreen that includes Wi-Fi 802.11b/g/n and Bluetooth 2.1 and is powered by a 6400 mAh Li-Ion which runs on a 1 GHz Nvidia Tegra 2 processor and Android 3.0 Honeycomb with Optimus UI.

Critics
The tablet has been criticised for the lack of updates provided by LG and for locking the bootloader with the first update it got without notifying users. Neither LG or T-Mobile were helpful with any of the issues usually playing dead.

While its competitors like Motorola Xoom were usually updated at least to Android 4.0.3 Ice Cream Sandwich and mostly even to Android 4.1 Jelly Bean, LG only gave its G-Slate 2 minor updates and wasn't even able to release an important version 3.2 Honeycomb which should be theoretically simple for LG to make and would improve compatibility with apps, stability and extend functionality.

Because of this and closed drivers the Android community was not able to make a fully functional ICS or Jelly Bean ROM - most importantly camera can't be used with those builds.

Latest official ROM was released in March 2012 and unofficial ROM was officially abandoned in January 2013.

See also
LG Optimus Pad LTE The first successor to the LG Optimus Pad
LG G Pad 8.3 The second successor to the LG Optimus Pad

References

Optimus Pad
Tablet computers
Android (operating system) devices
Tablet computers introduced in 2011